Ramsey Ann Naito (born 1974) is an American producer of animated films who currently serves as the president of Nickelodeon Animation and Paramount Animation (both subsidiaries of Paramount Global). She is best known for her 2017 production The Boss Baby; it earned her several awards and nominations including an Academy Award nomination for Best Animated Feature. Her mother was a painter and her Japanese father came from a long line of haiku artists.

Filmography

Executive 

2021: President – Paramount Animation
2020: President – Nickelodeon Animation
2018: Executive Vice President, Animation Production and Development - Nickelodeon
2018: Executive Vice President - Paramount Animation
2011: Producer - Blue Sky Studios
2005: Head of Movies - Cartoon Network
1998: Vice President - Nickelodeon Movies

Producer 

 2017: The Boss Baby (producer - as Ramsey Naito, produced by, p.g.a.) 
 2011: Level Up (TV Movie) (executive producer) 
 2010: Firebreather (TV Movie) (executive producer) 
 2009: Ben 10: Alien Swarm (TV Movie) (executive producer) 
 2009: Scooby-Doo! The Mystery Begins (TV Movie) (executive producer - uncredited) 
 2007: Ben 10: Race Against Time (TV Movie) (executive producer) 
 2006: Re-Animated (TV Movie) (co-producer) 
 2004: The SpongeBob SquarePants Movie (associate producer)

Production Manager 

 2006: Barnyard (production executive)
 2003: Rugrats Go Wild (production executive - uncredited)
 2002: The Wild Thornberrys Movie (production executive - uncredited)
 2002: Hey Arnold! The Movie (executive in charge of production)
 2001: Jimmy Neutron: Boy Genius (production executive - uncredited)
 2000: Rugrats in Paris: The Movie (unit production manager - uncredited)
 1999: South Park: Bigger, Longer & Uncut (unit production manager)

Others 

 1998: The Rugrats Movie (supervising coordinator) 
 1997: Aaahh!!! Real Monsters''' (TV Series) (design coordinator - 5 episodes) 
 1995-1997: Duckman: Private Dick/Family Man'' (TV Series) (Production Assistant, 5 episodes; production coordinator - 36 episodes)

Accolades

References

External links 

 

1974 births
Living people
American animators
American animated film producers
American women film producers
American women animators
Place of birth missing (living people)
DreamWorks Animation people
Paramount Pictures executives
American people of Japanese descent
Unit production managers